Ark is a ghost town in Dent County, in the U.S. state of Missouri.

A post office called Ark was established in 1901, and remained in operation until 1915. The community was a shipping point of lumber.

References

Ghost towns in Missouri
Former populated places in Dent County, Missouri